The American Chocolate later known as Walter was an American-assembled automobile. Manufactured from 1902 to 1906 by vending machine company the American Chocolate Machinery Co., in Manhattan, New York, owned by William Walter. He decided to expand his business by assembling automobiles in his factory. The cars were exhibited at the New York automobile show.

The cars were built from imported components, and were 30, 40, and 50 hp models.  Production was supervised by Swiss engineer William Walter, who began building cars in 1898.  The company relocated to Trenton, New Jersey in 1906, where it began producing cars under the name Walter.

After 1910 Walter was building 4 X 4 trucks, which were used by the military and municipalities. After World War I Walter truck switched from the brand's own four-cylinder motor to the Waukesha engine, and the company moved to a new location on Long Island in 1923. The company would be finally absorbed by Kovatch Mobile Equipment Corp (KME) in the late 1970s.

Models

Notes 

 
 Image of a 1902 Waltomobile Tonneau made by the American Chocolate Machinery Co.
 

Brass Era vehicles
Defunct motor vehicle manufacturers of the United States

Motor vehicle manufacturers based in New Jersey
Motor vehicle manufacturers based in New York (state)